The Christian-National Peasants' and Farmers' Party (or CNBL) was an agrarian political party of Weimar Germany. It developed from the German National People's Party (DNVP) in 1928.

The group had emerged following the 1928 election at which the DNVP suffered losses. In response the party appointed the radical right Alfred Hugenberg as leader and he adopted a policy of opposition to the Weimar Republic, the party having previously been critical of, but largely engaged with, the system. Hugenberg's ideas gained support among the large landowners but many of the smaller owners who were associated with the DNVP were alarmed by the shift and, under the direction of Karl Hepp, leader of the Landbund in Hessen-Nassau, they moved to form their own party. The new group was based in Hessen and Thuringia. It has been characterised as part of a wider attempt by the middle classes to assert their economic interests in the mid to late 1920s by founding their own, fairly narrowly based, parties, including the German Farmers' Party and in urban areas the Reich Party for Civil Rights and Deflation and Reich Party of the German Middle Class.

The party contested the 1928 in coalition with the German-Hanoverian Party to win nine seats individually and 13 for the coalition. It increased its share in 1930 to a party high of 19 seats as part of a Deutsches Landvolk group that captured 26 seats and included the Hanoverians, the Conservative People's Party and a smaller group using the name Konservative Volkspartei und Deutsch-Hannoversche Partei. Under the name Deutsches Landvolk it was part of the German National People's Party's bloc for the July 1932 election and managed to gain only one seat. They were eliminated from the Reichstag at the November 1932 election.

References

Agrarian parties in Germany
Political parties established in 1928
1928 establishments in Germany
Political parties in the Weimar Republic
Defunct Christian political parties
Main
Political parties with year of disestablishment missing
Protestant political parties
Christian political parties in Germany
German nationalist political parties